The Mayor of Central Hawke's Bay officiates over the Central Hawke's Bay District of New Zealand's North Island.

Central Hawke's Bay District was formed through the 1989 local government reforms by amalgamating Waipukurau and Waipawa districts. The inaugural mayor was Hugh Hamilton who served for two terms from 1989 to 1995.

The current mayor of Central Hawke's Bay is Alex Walker. She is a business owner who lives on a small farm with her shearer husband and children.

List of mayors
Since its formation in 1989, Central Hawke's Bay District has had six mayors. The following is a complete list:

References

Central Hawke's Bay
Central
Central Hawke's Bay District
Central Hawke's Bay